Maria Perego (8 December 1923 – 7 November 2019) was an Italian animation artist

Biography 
She has been known by fans as the woman who created the character Topo Gigio in 1959 with her husband Federico Caldura. She died on November 7th 2019 at the age of 95.

Works
Io e Topo Gigio (2015)

References

1923 births
2019 deaths
Italian animators
Italian women animators
Artists from Venice